Sir Michael John Gambon  (born 19 October 1940) is an Irish-English actor. Gambon started his acting career with Laurence Olivier as one of the original members of the Royal National Theatre. Over his six decade long career he has received three Olivier Awards, two Screen Actors Guild Awards, and four BAFTA Awards. In 1999 he was knighted by Queen Elizabeth II for services to drama.

Gambon appeared in many productions of works by William Shakespeare such as Othello, Hamlet, Macbeth and Coriolanus. Gambon has been nominated for thirteen Olivier Awards winning three times for A Chorus of Disapproval (1985), A View from the Bridge (1987), and Man of the Moment (1990). In 1997 Gambon made his Broadway debut in David Hare's Skylight earning a Tony Award for Best Actor in a Play nomination.

Gambon made his film debut in Othello (1965). Other notable films include The Cook, the Thief, His Wife & Her Lover (1989), The Wings of the Dove (1997), The Insider (1999), Gosford Park (2001), Amazing Grace (2006), The King's Speech (2010), Quartet (2012), and Victoria & Abdul (2017). Gambon has also appeared in the Wes Anderson films The Life Aquatic with Steve Zissou (2004), and Fantastic Mr. Fox (2009). Gambon gained stardom for his role of Albus Dumbledore in the Harry Potter film series from 2004 to 2011, replacing the late Richard Harris.

For his work on television he received four BAFTA Awards for The Singing Detective (1986), Wives and Daughters (1999), Longitude (2000), and Perfect Strangers (2001). He also received two Primetime Emmy Award nominations for Path to War (2002), and Emma (2009). Other notable projects include Cranford (2007), and The Casual Vacancy (2015). In 2017 he received the Irish Film & Television Academy Lifetime Achievement Award. In 2020, he was listed at No. 28 on The Irish Times list of Ireland's greatest film actors.

Early life 
Michael John Gambon was born in the Cabra suburb of Dublin on 19 October 1940. His mother, Mary (née Hoare), was a seamstress, while his father, Edward Gambon, was an engineering operative during World War II. His father decided to seek work in the rebuilding of London, and moved the family to Mornington Crescent in London's Camden borough when Gambon was six. His father arranged for him to be made a British citizen, a decision that would later allow him to receive a substantive (rather than honorary) knighthood. Brought up as a strict Roman Catholic, he attended St Aloysius Boys' School in Somers Town and served at the altar. He then moved to St Aloysius' College in Highgate, whose former pupils include actor Peter Sellers. He later moved to North End, Kent, where he attended Crayford Secondary School but left with no qualifications at the age of 15. He then gained an apprenticeship as a toolmaker with Vickers-Armstrong. By the time he was 21, he was a qualified engineering technician. He kept the job for a further year, acquiring a lifelong passion for collecting antique guns, clocks, watches and classic cars.

Career

Theatre

1960–1979: Stage debut and National Theatre 

At age 24, Gambon wrote a letter to Micheál Mac Liammóir, the Irish theatre impresario who ran Dublin's Gate Theatre, accompanied by a CV describing a rich and wholly imaginary theatre career: he was taken on.

Gambon made his professional stage debut in the Gate Theatre's 1962 production of Othello, playing "Second Gentleman", followed by a European tour. A year later, auditioning with the opening soliloquy from Richard III, he caught the eye of Laurence Olivier who was recruiting promising actors for his new National Theatre Company. Gambon, along with Robert Stephens, Derek Jacobi and Frank Finlay, was hired as one of the "to be renowned" and played any number of small roles, appearing on cast lists as "Mike Gambon". The company initially performed at the Old Vic, their first production being Hamlet, directed by Olivier and starring Peter O'Toole. Gambon played for four years in many NT productions, including named roles in The Recruiting Officer and The Royal Hunt of the Sun, working with directors William Gaskill and John Dexter.

After three years at The Old Vic, Olivier advised Gambon to gain experience in provincial rep. In 1967, he left the National Theatre for the Birmingham Repertory Company, which was to give him his first crack at the title roles in Othello (his favourite), Macbeth and Coriolanus.

In 1974, Eric Thompson cast him as the melancholy vet in Alan Ayckbourn's The Norman Conquests at Greenwich. A speedy transfer to the West End established him as a comic actor, squatting at a crowded dining table on a tiny chair and agonising over a choice between black or white coffee. Back at the National, now on the South Bank, his next turning point was Peter Hall's premiere staging of Harold Pinter's Betrayal, a performance marked by subtlety – a production photograph shows him embracing Penelope Wilton with sensitive hands and long slim fingers (the touch of a master clock-maker). He is also one of the few actors to have mastered the demands of the vast Olivier Theatre. As Simon Callow once said: "Gambon's iron lungs and overwhelming charisma are able to command a sort of operatic full-throatedness which triumphs over hard walls and long distances".

1980–1991: Rise to prominence and awards success 
Gambon's powerful voice and presence were to serve him in good stead in John Dexter's masterly staging of The Life of Galileo by Bertolt Brecht at the National Theatre in 1980, the first Brecht's play to become a popular success. Hall called him "unsentimental, dangerous and immensely powerful," and  The Sunday Times called his performance "a decisive step in the direction of great tragedy... great acting," while fellow actors paid him the rare compliment of applauding him in the dressing room on the first night.

The National Theatre staged revival A View from the Bridge in 1987 at the Cottesloe Theatre. It was directed by Alan Ayckbourn and Gambon gave an acclaimed performance as Eddie. The Guardian said "In the first place it shows Michael Gambon shaking hands with greatness."

Ralph Richardson dubbed him The Great Gambon, an accolade which stuck, although Gambon dismisses it as a circus slogan. But as Sheridan Morley perceptively remarked in 2000, when reviewing Nicholas Wright's Cressida: "Gambon's eccentricity on stage now begins to rival that of his great mentor Richardson". Also like Richardson, interviews are rarely given and raise more questions than they answer. Gambon is a very private person, a "non-starry star" as Ayckbourn has called him. Off-stage he prefers to stay out of the limelight. While he has won screen acclaim, his ravaged King Lear at Stratford, while he was still in his early forties, formed a double act with a red-nosed Antony Sher as the Fool sitting on his master's knee like a ventriloquist's doll.

1995–2005: Broadway debut and other roles 
There were also appearances in Harold Pinter's Old Times at the Haymarket Theatre and Ben Jonson's Volpone and the brutal sergeant in Pinter's Mountain Language. In 1995, Gambon starred in David Hare's Skylight, with Lia Williams, which opened to rave reviews at the National Theatre. The play transferred first to Wyndham's Theatre and then on to Broadway for a four-month run which left him in a state of advanced exhaustion. "Skylight was ten times as hard to play as anything I've ever done" he told Michael Owen in the Evening Standard. "I had a great time in New York, but wanted to return." Gambon received his only Tony Award nomination for Best Actor in a Play.

Gambon was not among the actors to grace Yasmina Reza's 'Art' at Wyndham's. But together with Simon Russell Beale and Alan Bates, he gave a droll radio account of the role of Marc. And for the RSC he shared Reza's two-hander The Unexpected Man with Eileen Atkins, first at The Pit in the Barbican and then at the Duchess Theatre, a production also intended for New York, but finally delayed by other commitments.

In 2001, he played what he described as "'a physically repulsive" Davies in Patrick Marber's revival of Pinter's The Caretaker, but he found the rehearsal period an unhappy experience, and felt that he had let down the author. A year later, playing opposite Daniel Craig, he portrayed the father of a series of cloned sons in Caryl Churchill's A Number at the Royal Court, remembered for a recumbent moment when he smoked a cigarette, the brightly lit spiral of smoke rising against a black backdrop, an effect which he dreamt up during rehearsals.

In 2004, Gambon played the lead role (Hamm) in Samuel Beckett's post-apocalyptic play Endgame at the Albery Theatre, London. In 2005, he finally achieved a lifelong ambition to play Falstaff, in Nicholas Hytner's National production of Henry IV, Parts 1 and 2, co-starring with Matthew Macfadyen as Prince Hal.

2006–2015: Final roles and stage retirement 
In 2006, he performed as Joe in Beckett's Eh Joe, giving two performances a night at the Duke of York's Theatre in London. That same year, he played Henry in Stephen Rea's play about Samuel Beckett's Embers for Radio 3. In 2007, he was Sam in Harold Pinter's The Homecoming for Radio 3.

In 2008, Gambon appeared in the role of Hirst in No Man's Land by Harold Pinter in the Gate Theatre, Dublin, opposite David Bradley as Spooner, in a production directed by Rupert Goold, which transferred to the London West End's Duke of York's Theatre, for which roles each received nominations for the 2009 Laurence Olivier Award for Best Actor. After Pinter's death on 24 December 2008, Gambon read Hirst's monologue selected by the playwright for Gambon to read at his funeral, held on 31 December 2008, during the cast's memorial remarks from the stage as well as at the funeral and also in Words and Music, transmitted on the BBC Radio 3 on 22 February 2009.

In late 2009, Gambon had to withdraw from his role of W. H. Auden in The Habit of Art (being replaced by Richard Griffiths) because of ill health. In April 2010, Gambon returned once again to the Gate Theatre Dublin to appear in Samuel Beckett's Krapp's Last Tape, which transferred to London's Duchess Theatre in October 2010.
Also in 2012, he starred with Eileen Atkins in an adaptation of Beckett's radio play, All That Fall. The director, Trevor Nunn, staged the performance as a studio recording of a radio play so that the cast performed with script in hand. Its premiere was at the Jermyn Street Theatre and it later transferred to the Arts Theatre. In November 2013 the production transferred to 59E59 Theaters in New York. In 2013, Gambon took part in the 50th Anniversary Celebration of the National Theatre.

In early 2015, Gambon announced that due to the increasing length of time it was taking him to memorise his lines, he was giving up stage work. He had previously tried using an earpiece and being given prompts by theatre staff, but found this unsatisfactory.

Film

1965–1988: Film debut and early roles 
He made his film debut in the Laurence Olivier's Othello alongside Maggie Smith and Derek Jacobi in 1965. After his film debut, Gambon was asked by James Bond producer Cubby Broccoli to audition for the role in 1970, to replace George Lazenby. He continued acting in the British horror films Nothing But the Night (1973), and The Beast Must Die (1974). In 1985, he appeared in the British drama film Turtle Diary directed by John Irvin with a screenplay adapted by Harold Pinter. The film starred Glenda Jackson and Ben Kingsley.

1989–2003: Independent films 
In 1989, Gambon starred in the Peter Greenaway film The Cook, the Thief, His Wife & Her Lover, which also starred Helen Mirren. He later starred as Fyodor Dostoyevsky in the Hungarian director Károly Makk's film The Gambler (1997) about the writing of Dostoyevsky's novella The Gambler. In the 1990s he appeared in films such as, Barry Levinson's fantasy comedy Toys (1992), the period drama Dancing at Lughnasa (1998), the action film Plunkett & Macleane (1998), Michael Mann's political drama The Insider (1999), and Tim Burton's gothic horror film Sleepy Hollow (1999).

During the 2000s, Gambon appeared in several films including Robert Altman's murder mystery ensemble Gosford Park.  In 2003, he appeared with Robert Duvall and Kevin Costner, playing the principal villain in the Western film Open Range.

2004–2011: Harry Potter and other roles 
In 2004, he appeared in five films, including Wes Anderson's cult comedy The Life Aquatic with Steve Zissou; the British gangster film Layer Cake; and theatrical drama Being Julia.

In 2007, Gambon appeared in Michael Apted's historical drama Amazing Grace alongside Ioan Gruffudd, Romola Garai, Benedict Cumberbatch, Albert Finney, Rufus Sewell. The film focuses on William Wilberforce who led the campaign against the slave trade in the British Empire. The film is Certified Fresh according to Rotten Tomatoes with critics consensus describing the film as "your quintessential historical biopic: stately, noble, and with plenty of electrifying performances." That same year, he played major roles the acclaimed BBC five-part adaptation of Mrs Gaskell's Cranford novels alongside Judi Dench, and Imelda Staunton and in Stephen Poliakoff's Joe's Palace.

His best-known role is perhaps that of Albus Dumbledore, Hogwarts' headmaster in the third instalment of J. K. Rowling's franchise, Harry Potter and the Prisoner of Azkaban, taking over the role after the death of Richard Harris. (Harris had also played Maigret on television four years before Gambon took that role.) Gambon reprised the role of Dumbledore in Harry Potter and the Goblet of Fire, which was released in November 2005 in the United Kingdom and the United States. He returned to the role again in the fifth film, 2007's Harry Potter and the Order of the Phoenix, and the sixth film, Harry Potter and the Half-Blood Prince. He appeared in the seventh and final film; Harry Potter and the Deathly Hallows Parts 1 and 2, released in two parts in 2010 and 2011. Gambon told an interviewer that, when playing Dumbledore, he does not "have to play anyone really. I just stick on a beard and play me, so it's no great feat. I never ease into a role—every part I play is just a variant of my own personality. I'm not really a character actor at all.'"

In 2010, Gambon appeared in Tom Hooper's historical drama The King's Speech as King George V, alongside Colin Firth, Geoffrey Rush, Helena Bonham Carter, and Guy Pearce. In 2011, the film received 12 Academy Awards nominations, more than any other film in that year. The film won four Oscars including Best Picture, Director, Actor, and Adapted Screenplay.

2012–2019: British films and comedies 
In 2012, he played a role in Dustin Hoffman's directorial debut with Quartet, based on the same-titled play by Ronald Harwood and starring Maggie Smith, Tom Courtenay, Billy Connolly and Pauline Collins. The film premiered at the 2012 Toronto International Film Festival to favourable reviews. The review aggregator website Rotten Tomatoes reported an 80% approval rating with the consensus reading, "It's sweet, gentle, and predictable to a fault, but Dustin Hoffman's affectionate direction and the talented cast's amiable charm make Quartet too difficult to resist."

In 2016, Gambon was the narrator for the Coen Brothers' Hollywood comedy Hail, Caesar!, which satirized the 1950s Hollywood film industry and featured an ensemble cast including Josh Brolin, George Clooney, Alden Ehrenreich, Ralph Fiennes, Jonah Hill, Scarlett Johansson, Frances McDormand, Tilda Swinton and Channing Tatum. The film was well received by critics, earning an approval rating of 86% on Rotten Tomatoes with the consensus being, "Packed with period detail and perfectly cast, Hail, Caesar! finds the Coen brothers delivering an agreeably lightweight love letter to post-war Hollywood." The film also received an Academy Award nomination for its Production Design. He found the role opposite Bill Nighy, Toby Jones and Catherine Zeta-Jones in the war comedy film Dad's Army (2016), based on the television sitcom of the same name. Gambon has also provided voiceovers as Uncle Pastuzo in the Paddington films (2014, 2018). The films star Ben Whishaw, Hugh Bonneville, Sally Hawkins, Julie Walters, Jim Broadbent, Peter Capaldi, Imelda Staunton, Brendan Gleeson, Hugh Grant and Nicole Kidman.

In 2019, he appeared in the biographical film Judy, about Judy Garland, starring Renée Zellweger, Rufus Sewell, Finn Wittrock and Jessie Buckley. That same year Gambon appeared in Adrian Shergold's period thriller Cordelia, acting alongside Johnny Flynn and Catherine McCormack.

Television

1967–1985: Television debut and early roles 
In 1967, he made his television debut in the BBC television adaptation of Much Ado About Nothing as Watchman No. 4. He also appeared in British programs such as Softly, Softly (1967), and Public Eye (1968). From 1968 to 1970, he featured in the BBC historical series The Borderers as Gavin Kerr. He also had a recurring role in the Canadian series The Challengers (1972). He also appeared in drama anthology series including Play for Today, Play of the Month, and ITV Playhouse.

1986–1999: The Singing Detective and acclaim 
His craggy looks soon made him into a character actor. For his lead role in Dennis Potter's The Singing Detective (1986) he won his first British Academy Television Award for Best Actor. He starred as detective Inspector Jules Maigret in an ITV adaptation of twelve of Georges Simenon's books. In 1990, he played Jerry in Harold Pinter's Betrayal for BBC Radio 3. In 1991, he starred as Tommy Hanbury in an episode of the ITV series Minder called "Look Who's Coming To Pinner". He also appeared in the BBC serial Wives and Daughters (1999) based on the Victorian novel by the same name by Elizabeth Gaskell. He portrayed Squire Hamley and received his second BAFTA Award nomination and win for Best Actor.

2000–2009: Established character actor 
Gambon starred in a made-for-TV adaptation of Samuel Beckett's Endgame (2001) and Perfect Strangers (2001) have revealed a talent for comedy. Gambon played President Lyndon B. Johnson in the television film Path to War. About his performance The Washington Post said: "Gambon is entirely up to the task of making a larger-than-life icon seem painfully -- and in the end, helplessly -- human. It is a performance of fire and brimstone". He was nominated for an Emmy Award for Best Actor in a Mini-series or Movie and a Golden Globe Award for Best Actor in a Miniseries or Motion Picture Made for Television.

In 2009, he appeared in a television adaptation of Jane Austen's famously irrepressible Emma, a four-hour miniseries that premiered on BBC One in October 2009, co-starring Romola Garai. He played Mr. Woodhouse for which he received a 2010 Primetime Emmy Award for Outstanding Supporting Actor in a Miniseries or a Movie nomination for his performance.

2010–2019: Roles in HBO and PBS projects 
Gambon appeared in the 2010 Christmas Special of Doctor Who, "A Christmas Carol". During the 2010s he has also known for his voice work. He appeared as the Narrator in the British version of Kröd Mändoon and the Flaming Sword of Fire. In 2013, Gambon provided the voice for The Prophet, a character in the MMORPG video game The Elder Scrolls Online. Gambon has performed voiceover for the Guinness ads with the penguins.

In 2012, Gambon reunited with Dustin Hoffman in the HBO horse-racing drama Luck, which was canceled in March 2012 after three horses died on set. Gambon participated in the live event, National Theatre Live: 50 Years On Stage (2013), a production that was a part of the celebration of the 50th anniversary of the National Theatre. The presentation included live performances, interspersed with documentary footage, and archival footage of live performances of original productions from the National Theatre. Gambon joined Derek Jacobi in a live performance from No Man's Land by Harold Pinter.

The following year, he was cast in the role of Howard Mollison in the adaptation of the best-selling book The Casual Vacancy by J.K. Rowling. The BBC One miniseries, produced in association with HBO, consists of three one-hour parts. Production began 7 July 2014 in South West England.

In 2015 and 2018, Gambon starred as Henry Tyson in the first and third series of Sky Atlantic's Fortitude. In March 2018, it was announced that Gambon would star in the comedy series Breeders. However, in April 2019, it was reported that Gambon left the series as he was having trouble memorising lines due to his issues with memory loss.

Personal life 

Gambon married mathematician Anne Miller in 1962 when he was 22 years old. Known for being protective of his privacy, he once responded to an interviewer's question about his wife by asking, "What wife?" The couple lived in Gravesend, Kent. They have one son, who later became a ceramics expert on the BBC series Antiques Roadshow.

Gambon brought Philippa Hart, a woman 25 years his junior, to the set while filming the 2001 film Gosford Park and introduced her to his co-stars as his girlfriend. When their affair was publicly revealed in 2002, he moved out of the home he shared with his wife. He has been with Hart since 2000, when they worked together on Channel 4 series Longitude. In February 2007, it was revealed that Hart was pregnant with Gambon's child and gave birth to a son. Hart gave birth to Gambon's third child in 2009.

In the New Year Honours 1998, Gambon was appointed a Knight Bachelor for services to drama. On 17 July 1998, he was invested by Prince Charles at Buckingham Palace.

Gambon is a qualified private pilot. His love of cars led to his appearance on the BBC series Top Gear. He raced the Suzuki Liana so aggressively that it went around the last corner of his lap on two wheels. The final corner of the Top Gear test track has been named "Gambon Corner" or simply "Gambon" in his honour. He appeared on the programme again on 4 June 2006 and set a time in the Chevrolet Lacetti of 1:50.3, a significant improvement on his previous time of 1:55. He clipped his namesake corner the second time, and when asked why by Jeremy Clarkson, replied, "I don't know, I just don't like it."

Acting credits

Awards and nominations

Notes

References

Further reading 

 Who's Who in the Theatre, Fourteenth edition, Pitman (1967) for National Theatre at the Old Vic playbills
 Who's Who in the Theatre, Seventeenth edition, Gale (1981)  for Michael Gambon's own CV up to 1980
 Giant of the Stage: A Profile of Michael Gambon by John Thaxter, The Stage newspaper, (16 November 2000)
 Gambon: A Life in Acting by Mel Gussow, Nick Hern Books (2004) 
 Theatre Record and Theatre Record annual indexes 1981–2007

External links 

 
 
 
 
 Biography at Tiscali UK
 2004 Interview with Sir Michael Gambon The Guardian (23 April 2004)
 theartsdesk Q&A with Michael Gambon (25 September 2010)
 Gambon's filmography at the British Film Institute

1940 births
Living people
20th-century British male actors
21st-century British male actors
Actors awarded knighthoods
Alumni of RADA
Audiobook narrators
Best Actor BAFTA Award (television) winners
British male film actors
British male Shakespearean actors
British male stage actors
British male television actors
British male voice actors
British people of Irish descent
Commanders of the Order of the British Empire
Critics' Circle Theatre Award winners
Irish emigrants to the United Kingdom
Irish knights
Irish male film actors
Irish male stage actors
Irish male television actors
Irish male voice actors
Knights Bachelor
Laurence Olivier Award winners
Male actors from London
Outstanding Performance by a Cast in a Motion Picture Screen Actors Guild Award winners
People from Cabra, Dublin
People from Meopham
Royal Shakespeare Company members